Tyräjärvi  is a medium-sized lake in the Iijoki main catchment area. It is located in the region Northern Ostrobothnia. In Finland there are three lakes with the name Tyräjärvi, of which this one is the largest.

See also
List of lakes in Finland

References

Central Finland
Lakes of Taivalkoski